The Toronto Northern Lights (TNL) is a Toronto, Ontario-based men's chorus of about 75 singers drawn from the Ontario District of the Barbershop Harmony Society. They won the title of Barbershop Harmony Society International Chorus Champions in July 2013 by a margin of two points over the two-time champion Westminster Chorus. The chorus had also earned the silver medal at five consecutive International Chorus Competitions (2001 to 2005), as well as bronze medals in 2000, 2006, 2007, 2009, 2010 and 2011.

With 34 men on stage in Kansas City in 2000, they were recognized as the smallest chorus to ever receive a medal at the International competition and have been considered instrumental in shifting the perception that a smaller chorus could not compete at the highest levels within the singing society.

TNL's expansive repertoire ranges from Barbershop to Broadway, Vocal Jazz to Doo-Wop, and from Gershwin to the Beatles.

TNL has been guest performers in Dortmund, Germany in March 2006 at the BinG! (Barbershop in Germany) convention and at the BABS (British Association of Barbershop Singers) convention in Cheltenham, England in May 2008.  In August 2010, they participated in the Vocal International Music Festival in Venray, Holland hosted by the Venray Mannenkorps as part of their 100th anniversary. In September 2012 the group traveled to Beijing, China and performed in the Forbidden City Concert Hall and on the Great Wall of China. In the Spring of 2015 the chorus traveled to Derby, England, Landau, Germany, and finally Stockholm and Nykoping, Sweden, as guests on various shows and the special guest at the Society of Nordic Barbershop Singers convention in Sweden.

Although Toronto is their home base, the chorus draws members from a large area, up to 200 miles, for rehearsals. Members hail from as far as Buffalo, to Ottawa, to Detroit.

The chorus attracts members from a wide range of ages, backgrounds and employment; from twenty-year-old university students, to business professionals, to men in retirement.

The chorus had released five CDs as of 2012.

The Toronto Northern Lights CD titled The Sky's The Limit was recorded at Metalworks Studios in Mississauga, Ontario.

Discography

Dare to Dream (2011)

Songs for the Season (2007)

The Sky's the Limit! (2005)

Brother Can You Spare a Dime? (2002)

Do You Hear the People Sing? (2000)

Awards and recognition

References

External links
Toronto Northern Lights Official website
Ontario District

Musical groups established in 1998
Musical groups from Toronto
Canadian choirs
Barbershop Harmony Society choruses
A cappella musical groups
1998 establishments in Ontario